Charles Haskins Townsend (September 29, 1859 – January 28, 1944) was an American zoologist and naturalist who served as the director of the New York Aquarium, from 1902 to 1937.

Early life
The son of the Reverend Daniel W. Townsend and Elizabeth Townsend, née Kier, he was born in Parnassus, Pennsylvania, and educated in public and private schools. He was a graduate of the Academy of Natural Sciences of Philadelphia. He subsequently worked at the Smithsonian Institution.

Career
In 1883, he became assistant United States Fish Commissioner in charge of salmon propagation in California. For a time, he was in charge of deep-sea explorations on the USS Albatross. From 1897 to 1902, he served as chief of the Fish Commission's fisheries division. He then served as director of the New York Aquarium at Castle Garden, from 1902 until his retirement in 1937.

Memberships and honors
In 1902 Townsend was an expert before the Russo-American fisheries arbitration at The Hague.  In 1912-13 he was president of the American Fisheries Society. He was elected a fellow of the New York Academy of Sciences.

He is commemorated in the names of Townsend's shearwater and the Guadalupe fur seal (Arctophoca townsendi).

He is also commemorated in the scientific names of three species of reptiles: Amphisbaena townsendi, Anolis townsendi, and Sphaerodactylus townsendi.

Writing

He wrote extensively on fisheries, whaling, fur seals, deep-sea exploration and zoology, including ornithology and herpetology. With Hugh McCormick Smith he wrote The Pacific Salmons section of Trout and Salmon (New York:  Macmillan, 1902), a volume of Caspar Whitney's prestigious American Sportsman's Library.

Selected publications
 Report of the Cruise of the Revenue Marine Steamer 'Corwin' in the Arctic Ocean in 1885 (1887)
 Porpoise in Captivity (1914)
 The Public Aquarium: Its Construction, Equipment and Management (1928)
 Guide to the New York Aquarium (1937)

See also 
 :Category:Taxa named by Charles Henry Tyler Townsend
 Ida May Mellen, secretary to Charles Haskins Townsend, 1916 to 1929; pioneering female ichthyologist

References

Further reading
 National Cyclopaedia of American Biography, (1945) v.32, p. 37.
 Grant, Chapman. (1947). "Dr. Charles Haskins Townsend". Herpetologica 4(1): 38–40.

External links
 
 
 
 Townsend Charts  at the Wildlife Conservation Society
 The Galapagos Tortoises—paper by Townsend, (1925) from Zoologica v.4(3).
 "Where the Nineteenth Century Whaler Made His Catch". (1931). New York Zoological Society v.34(6), p. 173-179.

American ornithologists
American ichthyologists
1859 births
1944 deaths
United States Fish Commission personnel
Wildlife Conservation Society people